Gisela is a female given name of Germanic origin. The name derives from the Old High German word gīsal, "pledge".

Variations on the name in other languages include:

Spanish: Gisela, Gicela,  Gicelberta
Catalan: Gisela
German: Gisela
French: Gisèle, Giselle
Hungarian: Gizella
Italian: Gisella
Polish: Gizela
Portuguese: Gisela

The male forms is Gísli and Gisle, from Gísla saga (Gisli's saga) possibly known from place names such as Gislaved, a municipality in Sweden.

Noble Giselas
 Gisela (daughter of Pepin the Short) (757 - 810-11), abbess
 Gisela, daughter of Charlemagne (in or before 781 - after 808)
 Gisela of Burgundy (c. 955 - 1007), daughter of Conrad, king of Burgundy, wife of Henry the Wrangler
 Giselle of Bavaria (c. 1085 - 1065), her daughter (also Gisela of Hungary), wife of Stephen I of Hungary
 Gisela of Swabia (c. 990-1043), Holy Roman Empress, wife of Conrad II, Holy Roman Emperor
 Gisela Agnes of Rath (1669-1740), Duchess of Anhalt-Köthen, Countess of Nienburg, regent of Anhalt-Köthen
 Archduchess Gisela of Austria (1856-1932), daughter to Emperor Franz Joseph I

Notable Giselas
Gisela (singer) (born 1979), Catalan singer
Gisela Arendt (1918–1969), German swimmer
Gisela Bleibtreu-Ehrenberg (born 1929), German sociologist, ethnologist, sexologist and writer 
Gisela Boniel (1977–2017), Filipino politician
Gisela Depkat (born 1942), Canadian cellist and teacher
Gisela Dulko (born 1985), Argentine tennis player
Gisela Grothaus (born 1955), German slalom canoeist 
Gísela López (born 1968), Bolivian journalist and politician
Gisela Richter (1882–1972), British-born archaeologist
Gisela Steineckert (born 1931), German writer 
Gisela Storz, American microbiologist
Gisela Stuart (born 1955), German-born British politician
Gisela Valcárcel (born 1963), Peruvian TV host
Gisela Wuchinger (born 1950), German Austrian singer, also known as Gilla

German feminine given names
Spanish feminine given names
Portuguese feminine given names
Catalan feminine given names
Polish feminine given names
Italian feminine given names
Hungarian feminine given names
Swiss feminine given names
Czech feminine given names